Mohammad Ali "Afshin" Peyrovani (born 6 February 1970 in Shiraz, Iran) is a retired Iranian footballer and a football coach. He is the younger brother of Gholam Peyrovani and Amir Hossein Peyrovani. He is a Football Director at Perspolis and a former player. A versatile player, he played in several positions throughout his career, including as a central defender and right defender. Throughout his club career, he played for Perspolis and Peykan and won Iran league for Fifth time. Following his retirement, he also served as a manager for Perspolis.

A former Iran national, he played in the 1998 World Cup, as well as the team that finished third In the 1996 Asian Cup.

Playing career

Club career
Peyrovani was a product of the Persepolis youth academy. On 1 August 1993 he was signed by the first team where he spent 10 years of his playing career making over 200 appearances. On 29 August 2004 he moved to Paykan Tehran F.C. on a one-year deal. Peyrovani ended his career at the end of the IPL 2004/05 season.

Club career statistics

International career
He has 66 caps for the Iran national football team and was a participant at the 1998 FIFA World Cup.

Coaching career
After the departure of Afshin Ghotbi in November 2008 he was appointed as the head coach of Persepolis F.C. and was replaced and became the assistant coach of Nelo Vingada in mid February 2009 and a month later he was sacked totally by the chairman.
He replaced Hamid Estili as the head coach of Steel Azin on 19 April 2010 and later on for the season after he was again appointed as the head coach of the team again which after poor results he resigned. On 6 November 2012, he was appointed as head coach of Azadegan League side Sang Ahan Bafq.

Director career

Iran National Football Team 
In September 2015, Peyrovani was appointed as director of Tean national football team. He was included in Carlos Queiroz staff for 2018 World Cup Qualifying Asia. After a while, he tendered his resignation as sporting director and left the Iran football team. In 2018, the disciplinary committee of the Iranian Football Federation suspended Peyrovani from all football activities for a period of five years due to financial irregularities.

Perspolis 
Peyrovani in December 2017  introduced as new director of football of Persepolis, being responsible for the club's major transfer market decisions.

Honours

Club 
Persepolis
 Iranian Football League:
 Winner (5): 1995–96, 1996–97, 1998–99, 1999–00, 2001–02
 Runner-up (2): 1993–94, 2000–01
 Hazfi Cup:
 Winner (1): 1998–99

References

External links

 
 RSSSF archive of Afshin Peyrovani's international appearances
 Peyrovani Sport Club

Iranian footballers
Association football defenders
Persepolis F.C. players
Persepolis F.C. non-playing staff
1996 AFC Asian Cup players
1998 FIFA World Cup players
Paykan F.C. players
Iranian football managers
People from Shiraz
1970 births
Living people
Iran international footballers
Persepolis F.C. managers
Bargh Shiraz players
Islamic Azad University alumni
Footballers at the 1994 Asian Games
Asian Games competitors for Iran
Sportspeople from Fars province
Persian Gulf Pro League managers